Thani Kudithanam is a 1977 Indian Tamil-language comedy drama film directed by S. A. Kannan. The film stars Cho Ramaswamy and K. R. Vijaya, with Y. G. Mahendran, Pandari Bai and Major Sundarrajan in supporting roles. It is based on the play of the same name by Marina. The film was released on 4 March 1977.

Plot

Cast 
K. R. Vijaya
Cho Ramaswamy
Major Sundarrajan
Pandari Bai
Y. G. Mahendran

Production 
Thani Kudithanam was based on the play of the same name by Marina. The film adaptation was directed by S. A. Kannan. The screenplay was written by Vietnam Veedu Sundaram.

Soundtrack 
Soundtrack was composed by M. S. Viswanathan.

Release and reception 
Thani Kudithanam was released on 4 March 1977. Kanthan of Kalki felt the film adaptation completely distorted the source play.

References

External links 
 

1970s Tamil-language films
1977 comedy-drama films
Films scored by M. S. Viswanathan
Indian comedy-drama films
Indian films based on plays